The 1954 Tourist Trophy may refer to the following races:
 The 1954 Isle of Man TT, for Grand Prix Motorcycles
 The 1954 RAC Tourist Trophy, for sports cars held at Dundrod
 The 1954 Dutch TT, for Grand Prix Motorcycles held at Assen